Rhondda Cynon Taf County Borough Council is the governing body for Rhondda Cynon Taf, one of the Principal Areas of Wales.  The council headquarters are located in the community of Cwm Clydach on the outskirts of Tonypandy.

History
The council was established on 1 April 1996 under the Local Government (Wales) Act 1994, covering the area of the three former districts of Rhondda, Cynon Valley, and Taff-Ely (except Pentyrch, which went to Cardiff). As well as taking over the functions of the abolished district councils, the new authority also took over the functions of the abolished Mid Glamorgan County Council in the area. The new county borough was described in the 1994 Act with different spellings in English and Welsh: Rhondda Cynon Taff (English) / Rhondda Cynon Taf (Welsh). The council now uses the latter spelling for both languages.

Political control
The first election to the council was held in 1995, initially operating as a shadow authority before coming into its powers on 1 April 1996. Political control of the council since 1996 has been held by the following parties:

Leadership
The first leader of the council, Bill Murphy, was the last leader of the old Rhondda Borough Council. The leaders since 1996 have been:

Current composition
As at 5 May 2022:

Party with majority control in bold.

Elections
Since 2012, elections take place every five years.

Party with the most elected councillors in bold. Coalition agreements in notes column.

Premises
The council is based at The Pavilions, a group of 1990s office buildings at the Cambrian Industrial Park in the community of Cwm Clydach on the outskirts of Tonypandy in the Rhondda, which is the largest urban area in the borough. When the council was created it inherited the offices of the three former district councils, being Rock Grounds on High Street in Aberdare from Cynon Valley, the Municipal Offices on Llewellyn Street in Pentre from Rhondda, and the Municipal Buildings on Gelliwastad Road in Pontypridd from Taff-Ely. In the period leading up to the creation of the new authority there was some debate about where the new council should be based, with Plaid Cymru leading a campaign for Pontypridd to be the headquarters, but Labour preferring a location in the Rhondda. The recently built site at The Pavilions was secured for the new council in 1995. The older offices at Aberdare and Pontypridd continue to be used by the council as secondary offices, whilst the Pentre building has been sold.

Mayors of Rhondda Cynon Taf
Past mayors of the council are:

1996–1997: Russell Roberts
1997–1998: K Rees
1998–1999: J David
1999–2000: G Beard
2000–2001: R Moses
2001–2002: L Jones
2002–2003: I Wilkins
2003–2004: D E B Arnold
2004–2005: A L Davies
2005–2006: E Jenkins
2006–2007: J Cass
2007–2008: Jane Ward
2008–2009: Margaret Davies
2009–2010: Robert Smith
2010–2011: Simon Lloyd
2011–2012: Sylvia J Jones
2012–2013: Doug H Williams
2013–2014: Ann Crimmings
2014–2015: John Watts
2015–2016: Barry Stephens
2016–2017: Rhys Lewis
2017–2018: Margaret Tegg
2018–2019: Steve Powderhill
2019–2020: Linda De Vet
2020–2021: Susan Morgans
2021–2022: Jill Bonetto
2022–: Wendy Treeby

Electoral wards

Since the 2022 elections, the Rhondda Cynon Taf county borough has been divided into 46 electoral wards returning 75 councillors.  Some of these electoral wards are coterminous with communities (parishes) of the same name. Some communities have their own elected council. The following table lists council electoral wards, communities and associated geographical areas:

* = Communities which elect a community council
c = Ward coterminous with community of the same name

See also
Environment Agency v Clark

References

External links
Rhondda Cynon Taf County Borough Council 

Politics of Rhondda Cynon Taf
Rhondda Cynon Taf